Spinnenkop Wedderveer is a wind powered sawmill in the village of Wedderveer, Groningen, Netherlands. It is a hollow post windmill of the type called "spinnenkop" by the Dutch built on top of a brick shed. The mill is listed as a Rijksmonument, number 388083 and is in working order.

History
The mill was designed by architect Luitje Wiersema and built by the first owner and operator Eiko Jan Feunekes in 1938 to saw lumber from his oak plantation. After Feunekes death in 1940 ownership of the mill changed several times and by 1985 the mill was in such a bad state of repair that it was under threat of dismantlement. It was saved from this fate by obtaining monument status in 1990. The new owners A. Dost and O. Schaver managed to restore the mill in 1997 using government subsidies.

Description

The mill of Wedderveen is what the Dutch describe as a "spinnenkop" (English: spiderhead mill).  It is a small hollow post mill winded by a fantail. It is one of only two windmills in the Netherlands using this winding system, the other being De Sterrenberg. 
The brake wheel on the windshaft drives the wallower at the top of the upright shaft in the body (called head on a spinnenkop), which passed through the main post into the substructure. Here the crown wheel drives a shaft with pulleys and a flat belt. The mill is built on top of a brick storage shed. It formerly powered a horizontal saw located outside. Currently the mill poweres a bandsaw housed in the shed.

Public access
The mill is open to the public on appointment.

References

External links

 

Hollow post mills in the Netherlands
Rijksmonuments in Groningen (province)
Westerwolde (municipality)
Windmills completed in 1934
Windmills in Groningen (province)
1934 establishments in the Netherlands
20th-century architecture in the Netherlands